The Cadillac Blackwing V8 (GM RPO LTA) is a twin-turbo DOHC V8 engine that was produced by the Cadillac Division of General Motors for use in its CT6-V between 2018 and early 2020. It is a clean sheet engine design, as well as the Division's first ever twin-turbo V8 engine. The engine was branded as the "Blackwing V8" by GM technicians, and is the first Cadillac-exclusive dual overhead cam V8 engine since the Northstar V8 was dropped in 2011.

The aluminum cylinder block features pressed-in iron liners, cross-bolted main bearing caps and houses a lightweight forged steel crankshaft, forged steel connecting rods and high strength hypereutectic aluminum pistons. There are four sodium-filled valves per cylinder.

The intercooled turbochargers are mounted between the cylinder banks in a so-called hot-V configuration and their twin scroll design broadens their performance capability, offering quicker response and greater efficiency. Ninety percent of the engine's peak torque is available at 2000 rpm and carried through 5200 rpm.

Other features include direct fuel injection  camshaft phasing, variable displacement/start-stop cylinder deactivation, and variable-pressure oiling system with piston-cooling oil jets.

All versions were to come equipped with the Ford 10L90 10-speed automatic transmission and Cadillac's all-wheel drive system.

In spite of its power and sophistication, high cost to produce the engine and low demand for the CT6-V led to its cancellation in early 2020, before it could be expanded to Cadillac's Escalade line.

Production 
When Cadillac introduced the new CT6-V in March 2018, the production was limited to 275 units for the US  market. The entire allocations were sold out in minutes as soon as the pre-order book was opened in January 2019. Cadillac did not anticipate the strong demand and introduced the second CT6 model with detuned Blackwing engine: CT6 4.2 Platinum, which sold out quickly as well.

Cancellation 
Cadillac intended for the Blackwing V8 engine to be exclusive for its flagship sedan, CT6, and stillborn larger sedan, Escala. However, the CT6 was a poor seller during its entire model run and was cancelled in February 2020. With estimated production cost of $20,000 per engine, the Blackwing V8 would be too expensive for Escalade when somewhat over half the performance is available from GM's 3.0-litre twin turbocharged LGW High Feature V6 engine.

In March 2020, Manifattura Automobili Torino announced that they would continue production and development of the Blackwing engine, in collaboration with Punch Torino. This was however promptly denied by GM. As of January 2022, the Blackwing was still available on Cadillac's parts website, however a spokesman for GM confirmed that they were not building any more of them.

Versions

See also
GM Ultra Engine
Cadillac V8 engine

References

Cadillac engines
General Motors engines
V8 engines
Gasoline engines by model